Atlason is a surname. Notable people with the surname include:

Arnór Atlason (born 1984), Icelandic handball player
Emil Atlason (born 1993), Icelandic football player
Hlynur Atlason (born 1974), Icelandic industrial designer
Jóhannes Atlason (born 1944), Icelandic football player and manager